This article describes the history of Australian cricket from the 2000–01 season.

Despite temporarily losing The Ashes in 2005, Australia has continued to dominate world cricket in the first decade of the 21st century.  Great players during this period have been Shane Warne, Glenn McGrath and Adam Gilchrist.

Domestic cricket
Queensland has been the strongest team during this period but there was a pleasant surprise for the cricket world when Tasmania, which staged the inaugural first-class Australian match in 1851, finally won the domestic championship for the first time in 2007.

Pura Cup winners
 2000-01 – Queensland
 2001-02 – Queensland
 2002-03 – New South Wales
 2003-04 – Victoria
 2004-05 – New South Wales
 2005-06 – Queensland
 2006-07 – Tasmania

International tours of Australia

West Indies 2000-01
For more information about this tour, see : West Indian cricket team in Australia in 2000-01

Zimbabwe 2000-01
''For more information about this tour, see : Zimbabwean cricket team in Australia in 2000-01New Zealand 2001-02For more information about this tour, see : New Zealand cricket team in Australia in 2001-02South Africa 2001-02For more information about this tour, see : South African cricket team in Australia in 2001-02Pakistan 2002For more information about this tour, see : Pakistani cricket team in Australia in 2002England 2002-03For more information about this tour, see : English cricket team in Australia in 2002-03Sri Lanka 2002-03For more information about this tour, see : Sri Lankan cricket team in Australia in 2002-03Bangladesh 2003For more information about this tour, see : Bangladeshi cricket team in Australia in 2003India 2003-04For more information about this tour, see : Indian cricket team in Australia in 2003-04Zimbabwe 2003-04For more information about this tour, see : Zimbabwean cricket team in Australia in 2003-04Sri Lanka 2004For more information about this tour, see : Sri Lankan cricket team in Australia in 2004New Zealand 2004-05For more information about this tour, see : New Zealand cricket team in Australia in 2004-05Pakistan 2004-05For more information about this tour, see : Pakistani cricket team in Australia in 2004-05West Indies 2004-05For more information about this tour, see : West Indian cricket team in Australia in 2004-05South Africa 2005-06For more information about this tour, see : South African cricket team in Australia in 2005-06Sri Lanka 2005-06For more information about this tour, see : Sri Lankan cricket team in Australia in 2005-06West Indies 2005-06For more information about this tour, see : West Indian cricket team in Australia in 2005-06England 2006-07For more information about this tour, see'' : English cricket team in Australia in 2006-07

References

External sources
 CricketArchive – itinerary of Australian cricket

Further reading

Australian cricket in the 21st century
Australian cricket seasons from 2000–01